MTV Music may refer to:

Television channels 
 MTV Music (Australian and New Zealand TV channel)
 MTV Music (British and Irish TV channel)
 MTV Music (Greek TV channel)
 MTV Music (Italian TV channel)
 MTV Music (Polish TV channel)
 MTV Music 24, a Pan-European music television channel

Websites 
 MTV Hive, a music news and video website previously called MTV Music
 MTV Artists Platform, an online music portal, successor to MTV Hive

See also 
 List of MTV channels